Rose pink is a reddish purple color. The first recorded use of rose pink as a color name in English was in 1760.

References